Gina M. Biegel is an American author and psychotherapist.

Biography
Gina M. Biegel is a graduate of Santa Clara University. She is the author of The Stress Reduction Workbook for Teens. Biegel is a Licensed Marriage and Family Therapist (LMFT) specializing in mindfulness-based stress reduction. She is also the director of research for Mindful Schools.

References

Living people
American women psychologists
21st-century American psychologists
Year of birth missing (living people)
Santa Clara University alumni
21st-century American women